Farnham station, or the Canadian Pacific Railway station is a disused railway station in Farnham, Quebec, Canada. Its address is 191 Victoria Road. The current station was built in 1950 to replace a previous station building (built in 1879–1882) which burned down in 1949, and opened to passenger service on March 8, 1951. The station saw its final passenger service on October 24, 1980. It was designated as a heritage railway station under the Heritage Railway Stations Protection Act in 1994.

The Farnham station building last served as the headquarters for the Canadian operations of the Montreal, Maine and Atlantic Railway (MMA), which declared bankruptcy in August 2013 as a direct result of the Lac-Mégantic derailment in July that year.

See also
 List of designated heritage railway stations of Canada

References

External links
HistoricPlaces.ca - Farnham Canadian Pacific Railway Station
 

Canadian Pacific Railway stations in Quebec
Disused railway stations in Canada
Railway stations in Montérégie
Railway stations in Canada opened in 1950
Designated Heritage Railway Stations in Quebec
Brome-Missisquoi Regional County Municipality